The 6th Emmy Awards, later referred to as the 6th Primetime Emmy Awards, were held on February 11, 1954, to honor the best in television of the year. The ceremony was hosted by Don DeFore at the Hollywood Palladium in Los Angeles, California. Don DeFore was president of the Academy of Television Arts and Sciences and sold this first national broadcast of the Emmy Awards to NBC.  All nominations are listed, with winners in bold and series' networks are in parentheses.

The ceremony included several new categories, including Best New Program, as well as awards for Supporting Actor and Actress in a television series. This was also the first year that acting nominees were nominated for a specific television show, in the past nominees were simply nominated as individuals.

Winners and nominees
Winners are listed first, highlighted in boldface, and indicated with a double dagger (‡).

Programs

Acting

Lead performances

Supporting performances

Hosting

Most major nominations
By network 
 NBC – 36
 CBS – 30
 ABC – 3

 By program
 I Love Lucy (CBS) / The Jackie Gleason Show (CBS) / Mr. Peepers (NBC) / Your Show of Shows (NBC) – 4

Most major awards
By network 
CBS – 8
NBC – 5
ABC – 3

 By program
 I Love Lucy (CBS) / The United States Steel Hour (ABC) – 2

Notes

References

External links
 Emmys.com list of 1954 Nominees & Winners
 

006
Emmy Awards
Primetime Emmy Awards
Primetime Emmy Awards
Primetime Emmy Awards
Primetime Emmy Awards